Kuzicus is a genus of Asian bush crickets belonging to the tribe Meconematini in the subfamily Meconematinae.

Species 
The Orthoptera Species File lists the following species, found in India, Indo-China, southern China, Korea, Japan and Malesia:
Subgenus Kuzicus Gorochov, 1993
 Kuzicus aspercaudatus Sänger & Helfert, 2006
 Kuzicus bicornis Ingrisch, 2006
 Kuzicus bicurvus Cui & Shi, 2019
 Kuzicus cervicercus (Tinkham, 1943)
 Kuzicus compressus Han & Shi, 2014
 Kuzicus denticulatus (Karny, 1926)
 Kuzicus denticuloides (Kevan & Jin, 1993)
 Kuzicus koeppeli Sänger & Helfert, 2004
 Kuzicus leptocercus Zhu & Shi, 2017
 Kuzicus megaterminatus Ingrisch & Shishodia, 1998
 Kuzicus mirabilis Tan & Wahab, 2018
 Kuzicus mirus Gorochov, 2016
 Kuzicus multidenticulatus Tan, Dawwrueng & Artchawakom, 2015
 Kuzicus multifidous Mao & Shi, 2009
 Kuzicus pakthongchai Tan, Dawwrueng & Artchawakom, 2015
 Kuzicus scorpioides Sänger & Helfert, 2006
 Kuzicus suzukii (Matsumura & Shiraki, 1908) – type species' (as Teratura suzukii Matsumura, locality Kyoto Japan)
Subgenus Neokuzicus Gorochov, 1993
 Kuzicus inflatus (Shi & Zheng, 1995)
 Kuzicus sarawakicus Liu, 2020
 Kuzicus uvarovi'' Gorochov, 1993

References

External links
Image of Kuzicus sp. at Natureloveyou.sg

Tettigoniidae genera
Meconematinae
Orthoptera of Asia